San José Tzal is a town located in the Mérida Municipality, Yucatán in Mexico.

References

Populated places in Yucatán